John O'Mahony (1937 – 8 August 2012) is an Irish former sportsperson. He played Gaelic football with his local club Kanturk and was a member of the Cork senior inter-county team from 1960 until 1969.

References

1937 births
2012 deaths
Kanturk Gaelic footballers
Duhallow Gaelic footballers
Cork inter-county Gaelic footballers
Munster inter-provincial Gaelic footballers